Phoenix Film Festival is a festival that celebrates feature films and their creators. Started in 2000, the annual celebration takes place in the city of Phoenix, Arizona.  The festival is a showcase for feature and short films from all over the world.

History
With the idea of starting a festival by filmmakers for filmmakers in Arizona, independent filmmakers Golan Ramras and Chris LaMont started the festival in 2000 with the help of Program Director Greg Hall and World Cinema Director Slobodan Popovic. Jason Carney has been the Festival Director since 2004. The Festival is run under the auspices of the 501(c)3 non-profit Phoenix Film Foundation.  The Phoenix Film Festival is now the largest attended festival in Arizona. In 2013 it had 23,000 attendees. The festival has hosted many notable members of the film industry such as  Kevin Bacon, Kyra Sedgwick, Laurence Fishburne, Tom Arnold and Danny Trejo, as well as filmmakers Don Roos and Ken Kwapis, and featured the premieres of Happy Endings, Mad Hot Ballroom and Loverboy.

Past winners

Feature film
 2013
 Putzel (Best Picture)
 The Story of Luke (Special Jury Prize)
 2012 – Shuffle 
 2011
 A Little Help (Best Picture)
 As If I Am Not There (Best World Cinema Feature)
 2010 – The Rivals
 2009 – Lightbulb
 2008 – Take
 2007 – Little Chenier
 2006 – Andrew Jenks, Room 335
 2005 – Checking Out
 2004 – Break a Leg
 2003 – Melvin Goes to Dinner
 2002 – Do It for Uncle Manny
 2001 – Middlemen

References

External links
 
 Google News Results for Search "Phoenix Film Festival"
 Phoenix Film Festival at the Internet Movie Database

Festivals in Phoenix, Arizona
Film festivals in Arizona
Film festivals established in 2000
Tourist attractions in Phoenix, Arizona
2000 establishments in Arizona